Alyda Norbruis (born 28 March 1989, Ureterp) is a Dutch/Frisian Paralympic cyclist. She won medals at the 2012 Summer Paralympics and the 2016 Summer Paralympics. She competed at the 2020 Summer Paralympics, in Women's time trial C1–3, winning a silver medal.

She competed at the 2012 Track Cycling World Championships.

References 

1989 births
Living people
Dutch female cyclists
Cyclists at the 2012 Summer Paralympics
Cyclists at the 2016 Summer Paralympics
Cyclists at the 2020 Summer Paralympics
Paralympic gold medalists for the Netherlands
Paralympic silver medalists for the Netherlands
Paralympic bronze medalists for the Netherlands
People from Opsterland
Paralympic medalists in cycling
Medalists at the 2012 Summer Paralympics
Medalists at the 2016 Summer Paralympics
Medalists at the 2020 Summer Paralympics
Paralympic cyclists of the Netherlands
21st-century Dutch women
Cyclists from Friesland